Port Lincoln Airport  is an airport serving Port Lincoln, a city in the Australian state of South Australia. The airport is owned and operated by the District Council of Lower Eyre Peninsula. It was the second busiest airport in South Australia during 2009/10, with 168,147 passengers served.

Facilities 
On 6 August 2013 a brand new airport terminal was officially opened, it cost $13.2 million.

Airlines and destinations

Statistics 
Port Lincoln Airport was ranked 37th in Australia for the number of revenue passengers served in financial year 2016–2017.

See also 
 List of airports in South Australia

References

External links
Port Lincoln Airport webpage

Airports in South Australia
Eyre Peninsula